The J. B. Crowell and Son Brick Mould Mill Complex is located on Lippencott Road near the hamlet of Wallkill, New York, United States, part of the Town of Shawangunk in Ulster County. It was established in 1870 by James Burns Crowell, after he changed his mind about a teaching career. The mill originally made not only brick moulds but wooden agricultural implements such as wheelbarrows and oxbows, as well as children's sleds.

Two years after it began operations, many of the current structures were erected. The complex was added to the National Register of Historic Places in 1983. It continues operating today, selling the same line of products to area builders.

References

External links
Company listing at MacRae's Blue Book.

Buildings and structures in Ulster County, New York
National Register of Historic Places in Ulster County, New York
Manufacturing companies established in 1870
Industrial buildings completed in 1872
Shawangunk, New York
1872 establishments in New York (state)